

The Pottier P.100 and its derivatives were a family of single-engine aircraft developed in France in the 1970s and 80s. They were high-wing cantilever monoplanes of conventional design with enclosed cabins and fixed tricycle undercarriage. The P.100 had two seats, arranged side-by-side, while the P.110 had its fuselage stretched by 50 cm (20 in) to include a third seat and a greater wingspan. The P.105 was a hybrid of the two designs, featuring the shorter, two-seat fuselage of the P.100 and the longer-span wings of the P.110.

Variants
 P.100TS - two-seat version
 P.110TS - three-seat version
 P.105TS - version with fuselage of P.100 and wings of P.110

Specifications (P.100)

Notes

References

 
 

1980s French civil utility aircraft
Pottier aircraft
Homebuilt aircraft
High-wing aircraft
Aircraft first flown in 1980